Pablo Willy Krögh Baraona (21 February 1963 – 2 September 2013) was a Chilean film, theater, television and voice actor. His credits included the Chilean films Machuca in 2004 and the 2009 dramatic film, Dawson Isla 10, in which he portrayed the late politician, José Tohá. His television roles included the Chilevision telenovela series, La Doña. He was starring in the TVN television series, Bim bam bum, at the time of his death in 2013.

Krögh died from tongue cancer in Santiago, Chile, at approximately 5:00 a.m. on 2 September 2013, at the age of 50. He had been diagnosed with tongue cancer in 2012. Numerous Chilean actors and directors posted tributes to Krögh on social media, including Ana Maria Gazmuri, Paula Sharim, Begoña Basauri, Lorena Capetillo, Herval Abreu and Daniel Alcaíno.

Filmography

Films

References

External links

1963 births
2013 deaths
Male actors from Santiago
Chilean male film actors
Chilean male telenovela actors
Chilean male television actors
21st-century Chilean male actors
Deaths from cancer in Chile
Deaths from oral cancer